Purana tigrina is a species of cicada found in Southeast Asia. It was described from Malabar, South India. It is a common species in the Malayan Peninsula and on Bunguran Island in the South China Sea.

The body length of a male is 22.5–29 mm and that of the female somewhat less at 18–23 mm. They have a greenish-ochraceous head and thorax, and brownish-ochraceous abdomen. The head and thorax are marked in black.

Description
Purana tigrina is a large insect with the wings extending well beyond the tip of the abdomen. The general colour is pale to dark brown tinged with green, and marked with black. The head has a prominent pair of compound eyes on the side, and between these are a pair of  short antennae set on conical bases. There are three small ocelli in a triangular shape located on the top of the head. The long, sharp mouthparts, known as the rostrum, are inserted into the trunks of trees to suck sap from the xylem. The thorax has three segments, each with a pair of legs, and bears two pairs of membranous wings, folded tent-like above the body when at rest; the wing venation is characteristic of the species. The abdomen is segmented and contains the reproductive organs. In females it is tipped by a large, saw-edged ovipositor, while in males, it encloses the tymbal organ which is used in the production of the song.

Distribution and habitat
Purana tigrina was first described in 1850 from the Malabar Coast of southwestern India by the English entomologist Francis Walker. It is common in the Malay Peninsula and Bunguran Island, and less common in southern Borneo, Sumatra and Nias Island. It occurs in primary lowland rainforest but is more often found in secondary forest, felled areas, parks and gardens.

Gallery

References

Leptopsaltriini
Hemiptera of Asia
Insects described in 1850
Taxa named by Francis Walker (entomologist)